Shock rock is the combination of rock music or heavy metal music with highly theatrical live performances emphasizing shock value.  Performances may include violent or provocative behavior from the artists, the use of attention-grabbing imagery such as costumes, masks, or face paint, or special effects such as pyrotechnics or fake blood. Shock rock also often includes elements of horror.

History
Screamin' Jay Hawkins was arguably the first shock rocker. After the success of his 1956 hit "I Put a Spell on You", Hawkins began to perform a recurring stunt at many of his live shows: he would emerge from a coffin, sing into a skull-shaped microphone and set off smoke bombs. Another artist who performed similar stunts was the British singer-songwriter Screaming Lord Sutch.

The 1960s brought several proto-shock rock artists. In the UK, The Who often destroyed their instruments, The Move did the same to television sets, and Arthur Brown wore vivid makeup and a flaming headpiece. In the US, Jimi Hendrix set his guitar alight at the Monterey Pop Festival in 1967. Detroit musician Iggy Pop of The Stooges adopted a violent, erratic onstage persona which drew widespread recognition, as Pop would often throw his body about the stage, frequently injuring his band members. Pop was known to wear a dog collar during some performances, along with arm length silver lamé gloves, exemplifying both shock and glam rock sensibilities. At at least one show in 1970, Pop smeared peanut butter on his body and threw it into the crowd as well.

On seeing Arthur Brown, Alice Cooper stated, "Can you imagine the young Alice Cooper watching that with all his make-up and hellish performance? It was like all my Halloweens came at once!"

The Plasmatics were an American punk rock band formed by Yale University art school graduate Rod Swenson with Wendy O. Williams.  The band was a controversial group known for wild live shows. In addition to chainsawing guitars, blowing up speaker cabinets and sledgehammering television sets, Williams and the Plasmatics blew up automobiles live on stage. Williams was arrested in Milwaukee by the Milwaukee police before being charged with public indecency. Jim Farber of Sounds described the show: "Lead singer/ex-porn star/current weight lifter Wendy Orleans Williams (W.O.W. for short) spends most of the Plasmatics' show fondling her family size breasts, scratching her sweaty snatch and eating the drum kit, among other playful events".

From the late 1970s to his death in 1993, GG Allin was known less for his music than for his wildly transgressive antics, which included indecent exposure (stripping and performing naked was one of Allin's most common rituals), on-stage defecation, coprophagia, self-mutilation, and attacking audience members.

In the 1980s in Richmond, Virginia, Gwar formed as a collaboration of artists and musicians. The band members make their own lavish monster costumes, which they claim are inspired by many of the creatures from H. P. Lovecraft's literary multiverse, the Cthulhu Mythos. Gwar frequently incorporates extravagant theatrics into their shows, such as mock jousts and pretending to murder each other.

The Mentors cultivated a shock-rock image by wearing executioners' hoods in concert and making deliberately outlandish statements to the press. In the 1990s, vocalist Eldon Hoke also began incorporating onstage sex acts into the band's repertoire.

In the 1990s and 2000s, Marilyn Manson became perhaps the most notable and well known act in shock rock. He was once dubbed by former US Senator Joseph Lieberman (D-Conn) as "perhaps the sickest group ever promoted by a mainstream record company." Manson's stage antics, such as burning the American flag and ripping pages out of the Bible, have been the focus of protests throughout his career. Manson argued that every artist has their means of presentation and that his visual and vocal styles are merely a way for him to control the angle that his audience and the general public view and interpret what he is trying to convey artistically.

See also
Punk rock
Deathrock
Glam rock
Hard rock
Instrument destruction
Glam metal
Heavy metal music
Stoner rock
Camp (style)
Cock rock
Industrial metal
Extreme metal
Nu metal
Death metal
Black metal
Hardcore punk
Deathcore
Visual kei

References

External links
Haenfler, Ross (2006). Straight Edge: Hardcore Punk, Clean-Living Youth, and Social Change (New Brunswick, N.J.: Rutgers University Press). 
Leblanc, Lauraine (1999). Pretty in Punk: Girls' Gender Resistance in a Boys' Subculture (New Brunswick, N.J.: Rutgers University Press). 
Lydon, John (1995). Rotten: No Irish, No Blacks, No Dogs (New York: Picador). 
McNeil, Legs, and Gillian McCain (1997). Please Kill Me: The Uncensored Oral History of Punk (New York: Penguin Books). 
Raha, Maria (2005). Cinderella's Big Score: Women of the Punk and Indie Underground (Emeryville, Calif.: Seal). 
Reynolds, Simon (2005). Rip It Up and Start Again: Post Punk 1978–1984 (London and New York: Faber and Faber). 
Robb, John (2006). Punk Rock: An Oral History (London: Elbury Press). 
Sabin, Roger (1999). Punk Rock, So What? The Cultural Legacy of Punk (London: Routledge). 
Savage, Jon (1991). England's Dreaming: The Sex Pistols and Punk Rock (London: Faber and Faber). 
Simpson, Paul (2003). The Rough Guide to Cult Pop: The Songs, the Artists, the Genres, the Dubious Fashions (London: Rough Guides). 
Taylor, Steven (2003). False Prophet: Field Notes from the Punk Underground (Middletown, Conn.: Wesleyan University Press). 

British rock music genres
American rock music genres